The Jalan Meru LRT station is a light rapid transit (LRT) station that serves the suburb of Klang in Selangor, Malaysia. The station is an elevated rapid transit station in Kawasan 17, Klang, Selangor, Malaysia, and is one of the stations on the Shah Alam line. This station forms part of the Klang Valley Integrated Transit System.

The station is marked as Station No. 19 along the RM9 billion line project with the line's maintenance depot located in Johan Setia, Klang. The Jalan Meru LRT station is expected to be operational in February 2024 and will have facilities such as kiosks, restrooms, elevators, taxi stand and feeder bus among others.

Locality landmarks
 New Business Centre(NBC) Commercial Park
 Sunshine Banquet Hall
 Your Hotel, Klang
 Klang Parade Shopping Centre
 Taman Bukit Intan, Klang
 Taman Jalan Meru
 SK (1) & (2) Jalan Meru
Klang High School
 Pejabat Pelajaran Daerah (PPD), Klang
 Pelangi Promenade Business Park
 Seri Pelangi Apartment, Kawasan 17
 Pelangi Court Condominium
 Pelangi Indah Flat

References

External links
 LRT3 Bandar Utama–Klang line

Rapid transit stations in Selangor
Shah Alam Line